is a Japanese four-panel manga series written and illustrated by Izumi Tsubaki. The chapters are serialized online in Gangan Online, and have been published in both physical and digital releases of Shoujo Romance Girly and tankōbon volumes by Square Enix. An anime adaptation by Doga Kobo aired in July 2014.

Plot
High school student Chiyo Sakura has a crush on schoolmate Umetarou Nozaki. When she confesses her love to him, he mistakes her for a fan and gives her an autograph. When she says she wants to be with him, he invites her to his house and has her help on some drawings. Sakura discovers that Nozaki is actually a renowned shōjo manga artist working under the pen name Sakiko Yumeno. She agrees to be his assistant in order to get closer to him. As they work on his manga , they encounter other schoolmates, who assist them and serve as inspirations for the story.

Characters

Main characters
 

 A cheerful high school girl with a crush on Nozaki. When she confesses to him by saying she's a fan, she gets Nozaki's autograph and, through further misunderstandings, becomes his inker assistant instead. She is member of the school's art club, and skilled at drawing still life and using watercolors. She is petite and notably wears two large hair ribbons with a polka dot pattern. Sakura first met Nozaki at their school entrance ceremony. Her hairstyle and ribbons back then were used subconsciously by Nozaki when designing his manga's heroine Mamiko. Due to her intense enthusiasm about Nozaki, almost all of her peers are aware of her crush. She is in class 2-A and shares a class with Seo. She has a younger brother named Towa.
 

 A tall, stoic high school student and the object of Sakura's affection. Using the pen name , he is secretly the creator of the shōjo manga Let's Fall in Love published in the magazine . Despite making a romance manga, he has no personal experience in love and seems unromantic in real life. He appreciates Sakura's friendship and drawing ability but is oblivious to her feelings. He lives on his own, having convinced his father that he can cover expenses with his manga royalties. In middle school, he was captain of the school basketball team but stopped playing to focus on making manga. He is in class 2-B. He has two younger siblings, Mayu and Yumeko.
 

 Mikoshiba, nicknamed , is one of Nozaki's assistants. Despite being popular and flirtatious with girls, he is shy and becomes embarrassed shortly after making bold statements. Sakura learns that he is the inspiration for Nozaki's heroine character Mamiko, unbeknownst to Mikoshiba. He assists Nozaki in filling backgrounds with flowers and other embellishments to bring out the charms. He is in class 2-G and shares a class with Kashima. His hobbies include collecting bishōjo figurines and playing dating simulation games, though he tries to hide his otaku interests from others. Mikoshiba admires a blog which features suggestive art by Nozaki's brother Mayu, under the assumption that it is run by a girl.
 

 Sakura's athletic friend and classmate. Often unintentionally, Seo offends her peers with her brash personality. Nozaki classifies her as : she cannot read the mood of a situation. She also has zero sportsmanship; the boys basketball team has her practice with them so they can learn how to deal with difficult players. She enjoys pestering Wakamatsu, whom she calls "Waka", due to her developing a crush on him. Inspired by their relationship, Nozaki makes a male character based on her named Oze. Her older brother is Ryōsuke.
 

 Mikoshiba's best friend and classmate. She is extroverted, tall and androgynous. In their first year, Mikoshiba and Kashima considered each other rivals but Kashima beat Mikoshiba in all aspects, eventually leading to their friendship. Nearly every single girl in the school is infatuated with Kashima due to "his" princely demeanor and complete confidence compared to Mikoshiba. Although she enjoys reveling in the attention she gets from girls, Kashima is instead openly in love with Hori and wants him to consider her his favourite "cute kōhai". She is the star member of the school drama club and acts as every lead male role, usually that of a prince. However, she often skips club activities and creates bizarre ideas or comments regarding Hori, making her the target of his anger. Furthermore, Kashima is tone deaf and thus is never cast in musicals, so she has Seo be her singing coach. She has a younger sister named Rei.
 

 President of the school drama club and Nozaki's assistant for background work, in exchange for Nozaki writing scripts for the drama club. Despite having incredible acting talent, Hori is self-conscious of his short height and prefers to work on directing plays and building sets instead. He has a short temper, triggered mostly by Kashima, and reacts violently towards her whenever she does anything inappropriate. Despite this, he still dotes on Kashima like a parent for her handsome appearance and acting ability. He is in class 3-C.
 

 Nozaki's junior from the basketball team in middle school. He joins Nozaki's staff to do screentones. He can be too forgiving and naive, making him the main target of Seo's harassment. Due to stress caused by Seo during and outside of basketball practice, he suffers from insomnia. Ironically, Wakamatsu immediately falls asleep whenever he hears Lorelai sing. He develops an infatuation with Lorelai, unaware of her true identity as Seo. Inspired by their relationship, Nozaki makes a female character based on him named Waka. He is in class 1-D.

Supporting characters

Nozaki's current editor. Although Ken appears as a grumpy overweight man, Nozaki admires him because he is competent in comparison to his previous editor. Ken is 28 years old (27 in the anime), and although he is the same age as Maeno, he had to retake college entrance exams and ended up being two years behind Maeno. It is revealed that his body became overweight due to stress caused by Maeno.

Nozaki's former editor, Maeno is currently in charge of Miyako Yukari. He is a narcissist who is fond of cute characters such as tanukis. He and Miyamae have known each other since high school. He regularly posts on the Monthly Girls' Romance editor's blog. He is careless in his actions; for example, he casually loses Yukari's manuscript and spills curry on another one.

Nozaki's upstairs neighbour. Miyako is a college student who is also a shōjo manga artist going by her real name. Her manga works feature a tanuki, mainly because her editor Maeno suggests it, and she has trouble standing up for herself. She keeps her identity as a manga artist a secret from her schoolmates, who are regularly concerned about her unknown job and relationships.

Nozaki's overly lazy younger brother. Because he was bullied when he was young, he rarely talks. He sometimes writes abbreviated phrases on what he wants to say, but will talk if it is quicker. The rare time when he puts in effort is when he captains his school's judo club. In order to teach his club members floor grappling techniques, he learned to draw cute girls in the various positions and holds referencing Mikoshiba's otaku collection. In an earlier draft, Mayu was drawn as a girl but the idea was scrapped due to reasons like her incompatibility with other male characters.

Seo's older brother is a college student who has a crush on Miyako, his classmate. Ryosuke works part-time in a cafe. His efforts to be closer to Miyako usually fail, and he once ends up mistaking Nozaki as her boyfriend. He knows that his younger sister is attracted to Wakamatsu, and assumes the love is mutual when Wakamatsu states he is in love with Lorelei.

 The younger sister to the Nozaki brothers. She is bad at drawing, and is the only one in her family who refuses to believe her oldest brother is a manga artist. She loves the character Suzuki and her ideal guy is a transfer student. Yumeko was originally drafted as the main character of the series, with her brother Umetarō as a support character. This idea was scrapped and her and Umetarō's roles were reversed.

Sakura's younger brother, Towa is a second year in junior high. He is a member of the tennis club. Sakura often annoys him with biased love talk about Nozaki. As a result, Towa's first impression of Nozaki is that he is a popular model.

Kashima's younger sister, a sheltered girl who is a big fan of Yumeno Sakiko's works. Having only ever attended all-girls schools, she is very interested in notions of romance, her imagination easily spinning out of control.

Let's Fall in Love characters

Heroine of Nozaki's manga. Much of the manga surrounds Mamiko and her various attempts to win over Suzuki's affections. Her personality is modeled after Mikoshiba, while her appearance is based on Nozaki's first meeting with Sakura, when she gave one of her white-coloured ribbons to him and walked away with the other one in her hair. In the anime, Sakura wears a single white-coloured ribbon, styled just like Mamiko's.

Hero of Nozaki's manga. He is Mamiko's love interest. Suzuki's appearance is Nozaki's easiest and favourite face to draw. As a result, Suzuki and his friend and rival initially all looked the same, so Nozaki had Sakura scout for other character designs.

A male supporting character of Nozaki's manga, whose personality is modeled after Seo. The character has shown to be quite popular within the readership of Nozaki's manga.

A female supporting character of Nozaki's manga, whose personality is modeled after Wakamatsu.

Media

Manga
Izumi Tsubaki began serializing the manga in Square Enix's online magazine Gangan Online on August 25, 2011. As of August 2022, the series has been collected into fourteen tankōbon volumes. Apart from the comics, an official fanbook and an anthology manga (containing stories by Satsuki Yoshino (Barakamon), Yasunobu Yamauchi (Daily Lives of High School Boys), Tachibana Higuchi (Gakuen Alice), Shigeru Takao, and Dan Ichikawa) have also been published, both on August 22, 2014. North American publisher Yen Press announced that they had licensed the series at Sakura-Con in April 2015. Individual chapters are called "issues".

Volume list

Drama CD
Frontier Works released a drama CD on June 26, 2013 featuring the casts below which differ from the later produced anime. It reached number 32 on Oricon's CD Album rankings.
 Chiyo Sakura: Asuka Nishi
 Umetarō Nozaki: Hiroki Yasumoto
 Mikoto Mikoshiba: KENN
 Yuzuki Seo: Miyuki Sawashiro
 Yū Kashima: Chie Matsuura
 Masayuki Hori: Junji Majima
 Hirotaka Wakamatsu: Daisuke Namikawa
 Mamiko: Yukari Tamura
 Saburō Suzuki: Daisuke Namikawa
 Tomoda: Takahiro Mizushima

Anime
Media Factory announced an anime adaptation on March 21, 2014 and the anime's official website posted several videos, revealing key cast and staff members, which differ from the drama CD. The anime is produced by Doga Kobo and directed by Mitsue Yamazaki, who had worked on Hakkenden: Eight Dogs of the East and Durarara. Series composition is handled by Yoshiko Nakamura. Junichirō Taniguchi, who did the second season of Genshiken and the Puella Magi Madoka Magica film, is in charge of character design. It premiered on July 7, 2014 on TV Tokyo, followed by TV Osaka, TV Aichi, TSC, TV Hokkaido, TVQ, AT-X over the rest of the week. The opening theme, titled  is composed and performed by Masayoshi Ōishi, and the ending theme  is performed by Ari Ozawa under her character name, Chiyo Sakura.

On July 25, 2014, Sentai Filmworks announced it has licensed the series for home video release. Media Factory released it on Blu-ray and DVD formats in Japan starting on September 24, 2014 across six volumes. Mini-OVA specials were bundled with each Blu-ray/DVD volume.

The series began streaming on Netflix on May 1, 2020, including dubs in English, Spanish and Portuguese.

Episode list
All episodes were written by Yoshiko Nakamura.

Reception
The manga's second volume reached number 18 on Oricon's weekly manga chart, its third volume reached number 11, and its fourth volume debuted at number 5 with 117,310 copies. The fifth manga volume debuted at number 4, selling 185,392 copies. The series placed at number 3 on a list of top 15 manga recommended by bookstores in 2013, and ranked number 11 in the list of top 20 manga for female readers of the 2014 edition of Takarajimasha's Kono Manga ga Sugoi! guidebook, which surveys manga industry professionals. It was a nominee for the 8th Manga Taishō.

The official fan book reached number 14, and the anthology book reached number 17 on Oricon's weekly best-sellers chart.

Greg Smith of The Fandom Post found the anime adaptation to be a "both a celebration and a send-up of shoujo manga at the same time". He found it to have a natural flow and enjoyed the emotions and expressions presented by the characters. He gave the series an A, noting it was one of the two consistently funny comedies of the season. He liked that "there was in general a lack of meanness or malice (except towards Maeno, which was quite well deserved)," and that it effectively showcased the absurdity of shojo tropes. Andy Hanley of UK Anime Network gave the series 7 out of 10, highlighting its charming and lovable cast as well as the show's visuals, although he would not call it a comedy classic. Dee Hogan, in an article for The Mary Sue, found the show to be "simultaneously very funny and sneakily brilliant" and wrote about how the show "manages the rare feat of a triple-reversal, and all three deal with our understanding of gender roles in fiction".

The reviewers at Anime News Network listed the anime as one of the best of the year for 2014, with Amy McNulty and Theron Martin naming it their top pick. Kelly Quinn of Tor.com also listed it among her top 10 best shows of 2014.

Works cited

Manga volumes
Monthly Girls’ Nozaki-kun manga volumes by Izumi Tsubaki. Published by Square Enix.

Anime episodes

Notes

References

External links
  
  at Gangan Online 
 

2010s webcomics
2014 anime television series debuts
Doga Kobo
Gangan Online manga
Japanese comedy webcomics
Manga creation in anime and manga
Parody anime and manga
Romance webcomics
Romantic comedy anime and manga
School life in anime and manga
Sentai Filmworks
Shōnen manga
TV Tokyo original programming
Webcomics in print
Yen Press titles
Yonkoma